Sandem is a surname. Notable people with the surname include:

Thomas Sandem (born 1973), Norwegian footballer
Vidar Sandem (born 1947), Norwegian actor, playwright and theatre director

Norwegian-language surnames